Cindy J. Noe is an American politician who served as a member of the Indiana House of Representatives for the 87th District from 2002 to 2012. She served on the Education, Family, Children and Human Affairs committees.

Early life and education 
Noe was born in St. Louis, Missouri and raised in Indianapolis, Indiana. She earned a Bachelor of Science degree in business from the Indiana University Bloomington.

Career 
Rep. Noe is the founder and CEO of IHM Facility Services, Inc., located in Fishers, Indiana. She graduated from the Indiana University School of Business and became the first Lugar Series and Indiana Leadership Forum graduate to serve in the House of Representatives. She has been elected Republican Precinct Committeewoman for Washington Township #36, 1996 – present. Rep. Noe also serves on the National Federation of Independent Business, Leadership Council; the Character Council of Indiana, Board of Directors; and as a member of Grace Community Church in Noblesville, Indiana.

Personal life 
Noe and her husband, John, have two children. She is a longtime resident of Marion County, Indiana.

References

External links
Indiana State Legislature – Representative Cindy Noe Official government website
Project Vote Smart – Representative Cindy J. Noe (IN) profile
CindyNoe.com Campaign site

Members of the Indiana House of Representatives
Living people
Politicians from Indianapolis
Politicians from St. Louis
Indiana University alumni
Women state legislators in Indiana
1947 births
People from Fishers, Indiana
People from Marion County, Indiana
21st-century American women